San Wai is a walled village in Ha Tsuen, Yuen Long District, Hong Kong.

Administration
San Wai is a recognized village under the New Territories Small House Policy. For electoral purposes, San Wai is part of the Ha Tsuen constituency.

History
At the time of the 1911 census, the population of San Wai was 487. The number of males was 215.

Features
The Yeung Hau Temple of San Wai, also called the Sai Tau Miu, was renovated in 1901. It serves as the social venue which plays the dual roles as a temple and an ancestral hall of San Wai. Basin meal feasts are organized in front of the Temple during Yeung Hau Festival and Lunar New Year.

See also
 Walled villages of Hong Kong
 Sik Kong Tsuen
 Sik Kong Wai

References

External links

 Delineation of area of existing village San Wai (Ha Tsuen) for election of resident representative (2019 to 2022)
 Antiquities and Monuments Office. Hong Kong Traditional Chinese Architectural Information System. San Wai (Ha Tsuen)
 Antiquities Advisory Board. Pictures of Yeung Hau Temple, San Wai, Ha Tsuen

Villages in Yuen Long District, Hong Kong
Ha Tsuen